The 2020 season was the 99th in the Cruzeiro Esporte Clube's existence.

Along with the Campeonato Brasileiro Série B – which Cruzeiro played for the first time in their history after being relegated in the 2019 season –, the club also competed in the Campeonato Mineiro and in the Copa do Brasil.

All competitions were suspended between 17 March and 25 July due to the COVID-19 pandemic in Brazil, which led the season to extend until 29 January 2021.

Players

Squad information 
Last updated on 30 January 2021.

Transfers and loans 
Last updated on 6 November 2020.

Transfers in

Loans in

Transfers out

Loans out

Competitions

Overview

Campeonato Mineiro

First stage

Troféu Inconfidência

Campeonato Brasileiro Série B 

On 3 October 2019, the Brazilian Football Confederation announced that the 2020 Campeonato Brasileiro Série B would be played between 2 May and 28 November. However, due to the COVID-19 pandemic in Brazil and the consequent suspension of all football competitions between March and June, the games were rescheduled for dates between 8 August 2020 and 30 January 2021.

On 19 May 2020, according to a FIFA decision, it was announced that Cruzeiro would start the competition with a 6-point penalty due to the non-payment of the club's debt to Al Wahda for the loan from midfielder Denílson in 2016.

League table

Results by round

Matches

Copa do Brasil 

The drawn for the first stage was held on 12 December 2019.

First stage

Second stage

Third stage

Squad statistics

Appearances 
Players with no appearances not included in the list.

Goalscorers 
Includes all competitive matches.
.

Assists 
Includes all competitive matches. Not all goals have an assist.
.

Clean sheets 
Includes all competitive matches.
.

Disciplinary record 
Includes all competitive matches.
.

Notes

References

External links 
 Cruzeiro Esporte Clube
 Cruzeiro official website (in Portuguese)

Brazilian football clubs 2020 season
2020 Cruzeiro Esporte Clube season